Dorodnitsyn Computing Centre, known as the Computing Centre of the Academy of Sciences (CC RAS) until 2015, is a research institute of the Russian Academy of Sciences of the Soviet Union. It was established in 1955.

Its areas of research include:
Computational Fluid Dynamics
Mathematical Physics
Mathematical modeling of Climatic Ecological Processes and other Nonlinear Phenomena
Solid mechanics and Elastic-Plastic Problems
Pattern Recognition and Image Analysis
Computer Aided Design
Optimization Methods, Linear and Nonlinear programming
Analytical mechanics and Lyapunov's Stability of Motion
Rigid body dynamics and Space Dynamics
Interactive Optimization and Decision support systems
Parallel Computing
Artificial Intelligence
Mathematical modeling of Economic Processes
Software development

Anatoly Dorodnitsyn, for whom the centre is named, was its director from 1955–1989.

The prestigious Journal of Computational Mathematics and Mathematical Physics has been published by the Computing Centre since 1960.

The game Tetris was created by Alexey Pajitnov at the Computing Centre.

After 15 June 2015, CC RAS was included in Federal research centre "Informatic and Control" of RAS and now no longer exists as an independent institute.

Scientists 
Andrey Ershov
Andrey Markov Jr.
Nikita Moiseyev
Valentin Vital'yevich Rumyantsev
Yuri Zhuravlyov
Leonid Khachiyan
Vladimir Alexandrov

External links
Dorodnitsyn Computing Centre website
Journal of Computational Mathematics and Mathematical Physics

Research institutes in the Soviet Union
Computing in the Soviet Union
Institutes of the Russian Academy of Sciences